A tragedy is a literary work with an unhappy outcome.

Tragedy may also refer to:

Music

Albums
Tragedy (Julia Holter album), 2011
Tragedies (album), a 1995 album by Norwegian band Funeral
Tragedy (Forever Storm album), 2013

Musicians
Tragedy (band), an American hardcore punk band
Tragedy Khadafi (born 1971), rapper also known simply as Tragedy
Tragedy (band), a heavy metal Bee Gees tribute band; see Corn Mo

Songs
"Tragedy" (Thomas Wayne song), 1959
"Tragedy" (Bee Gees song), 1979
"Tragedy" (Hanoi Rocks song), 1981
"Tragedy" (KAT-TUN song), 2016  
"Tragedy", a song by Marc Anthony from Mended
"Tragedy", a song by the Bats from Daddy's Highway, 1987
"Tragedy", a song by Argent from All Together Now
"The Tragedy", a song by Jeremih and Chance the Rapper from Merry Christmas Lil' Mama

Other
 Tragedy (event), one or more deaths that bring grief to society
Tragedy (1925 film), a German silent drama film
 "Chapter 14: The Tragedy", 2020 episode of The Mandalorian
 Surviving: A Family in Crisis, also known as Tragedy, a 1985 made-for-television movie starring Zach Galligan, Molly Ringwald and River Phoenix
 Melpomene, Muse of Tragedy